The Campeonato Argentino de Rugby 1980 was won by the selection of Buenos Aires that beat in the final the selection of Córdoba

Rugby Union in Argentina in 1980

National 
 The Buenos Aires Champsionship was won by San Isidro Club
 The Cordoba Province Championship was won by Tala
 The North-East Championship was won by Lawn Tennis
 The selection of Buenos Aires won also the "Campeonato Juvenil" (under-19)

International 
 In April 1980 the selection del Sudamérica XV in April went to South Africa.

 In October, the Springboks were in South America, but no matches were allowed by Argentina government, so the matches was played in Chile, Uruguay and Paraguay.

 In November, Fiji visited Argentina on tour.

Preliminaries

Zone 1

Zone 2

Zone 3

Zone 4

Interzone

Semifinals

Third place final

Final

Buenos Aires : 15. M. Campo, 14. Cappelletti, 12.M. Loffreda, 12. R. Madero, 11.A. Puccio, 10.H. Porta (cap.), 9. R. Landajo, 8.T. Petersen, 7.A. Travaglini, 6.C. Serrano, 5.E. Ure, 4.A. Iachetti, 3.C. Saint Trápaga, 2,A. Cubelli, 1.F.Morelo
 Còrdoba : 15.M. Villarino, 14.D. Grecco, 13.J. Cannote, 12.N. Albrisi (cap., 11.N.Ambrogio, 10. R. Virgolini, 9. M.Ferrara, 8.M. Martínez, 7.J. Aguad (Gastoldi), 6.R. Boroch, 5.R. Lobato, 4. D. Praddaude, 3.E. Rodríguez, 2. J. Albrisí, 1.A. Cravero.

External links 
 Memorias de la UAR 1980
 Francesco Volpe, Paolo Pacitti (Author), Rugby 2000, GTE Gruppo Editorale (1999)

Campeonato Argentino de Rugby
Argentina
Rugby